Sperner's theorem, in discrete mathematics, describes the largest possible families of finite sets none of which contain any other sets in the family. It is one of the central results in extremal set theory.  It is named after Emanuel Sperner, who published it in 1928.

This result is sometimes called Sperner's lemma, but the name "Sperner's lemma" also refers to an unrelated result on coloring triangulations.  To differentiate the two results, the result on the size of a Sperner family is now more commonly known as Sperner's theorem.

Statement
A family of sets in which none of the sets is a strict subset of another is called a Sperner family, or an antichain of sets, or a clutter. For example, the family of k-element subsets of an n-element set is a Sperner family. No set in this family can contain any of the others, because a containing set has to be strictly bigger than the set it contains, and in this family all sets have equal size. The value of k that makes this example have as many sets as possible is n/2 if n is even, or either of the nearest integers to n/2 if n is odd.

Sperner's theorem states that these examples  are the largest possible Sperner families over an n-element set.
Formally, the theorem states that, 
for every Sperner family S whose union has a total of n elements,  and
equality holds if and only if S consists of all subsets of an n-element set that have size  or all that have size .

Partial orders
Sperner's theorem can also be stated in terms of partial order width. The family of all subsets of an n-element set (its power set) can be partially ordered by set inclusion; in this partial order, two distinct elements are said to be incomparable when neither of them contains the other. The width of a partial order is the largest number of elements in an antichain, a set of pairwise incomparable elements. Translating this terminology into the language of sets, an antichain is just a Sperner family, and the width of the partial order is the maximum number of sets in a Sperner family.

A graded partially ordered set is said to have the Sperner property when one of its largest antichains is formed by a set of elements that all have the same rank. In this terminology, Sperner's theorem states that the partially ordered set of all subsets of a finite set, partially ordered by set inclusion, has the Sperner property.

Proof 
There are many proofs of Sperner's theorem, each leading to different generalizations (see ).

Let sk denote the number of k-sets in S. For all 0 ≤ k ≤ n,

and, thus,

Since S is an antichain, we can sum over the above inequality from k = 0 to n and then apply the LYM inequality to obtain

which means

This completes the proof of part 1.

To have equality, all the inequalities in the preceding proof must be equalities.  Since 

if and only if  or  we conclude that equality implies that S consists only of sets of sizes  or   For even n that concludes the proof of part 2.

For odd n there is more work to do, which we omit here because it is complicated.  See , pp. 3–4.

Generalizations
There are several generalizations of Sperner's theorem for subsets of  the poset of all subsets of E.

No long chains
A chain is a subfamily  that is totally ordered, i.e.,  (possibly after renumbering).  The chain has r + 1 members and length r.  An r-chain-free family (also called an r-family) is a family of subsets of E that contains no chain of length r.   proved that the largest size of an r-chain-free family is the sum of the r largest binomial coefficients .  The case r = 1 is Sperner's theorem.

p-compositions of a set
In the set  of p-tuples of subsets of E, we say a p-tuple  is ≤ another one,  if  for each i = 1,2,...,p.  We call   a p-composition of E if the sets  form a partition of E.   proved that the maximum size of an antichain of p-compositions is the largest p-multinomial coefficient  that is, the coefficient in which all ni are as nearly equal as possible (i.e., they differ by at most 1).  Meshalkin proved this by proving a generalized LYM inequality.

The case p = 2 is Sperner's theorem, because then  and the assumptions reduce to the sets  being a Sperner family.

No long chains in p-compositions of a set
 combined the Erdös and Meshalkin theorems by adapting Meshalkin's proof of his generalized LYM inequality.  They showed that the largest size of a family of p-compositions such that the sets in the i-th position of the p-tuples, ignoring duplications, are r-chain-free, for every  (but not necessarily for i = p), is not greater than the sum of the  largest p-multinomial coefficients.

Projective geometry analog
In the finite projective geometry PG(d, Fq) of dimension d over a finite field of order q, let  be the family of all subspaces.

Their proof is by a projective analog of the LYM inequality.

No long chains in p-compositions of a projective space
 obtained a Meshalkin-like generalization of the Rota–Harper theorem. The theorem is that a family of Meshalkin sequences of length p in PG(d, Fq), such that the subspaces appearing in position i of the sequences contain no chain of length r for each  is not more than the sum of the largest  of the quantities 
 
where  (in which we assume that ) denotes the p-Gaussian coefficient 
 
and 
 
the second elementary symmetric function of the numbers

See also

 Dilworth's theorem
 Erdős–Ko–Rado theorem

References
.
.
.
.

.
.
.
.

External links
 Sperner's Theorem at cut-the-knot
 Sperner's theorem on the polymath1 wiki

Families of sets
Factorial and binomial topics
Articles containing proofs